Robert Daniel San Souci (October 10, 1946 – December 19, 2014) was a multiple award-winning children's book author known most for his retellings of folktales for children. A native Californian, Robert D. San Souci was born in San Francisco and raised across the bay in Berkeley. He often worked with his brother, Daniel San Souci, a children's book illustrator. He was widely sought as a presenter at conferences, trade shows, and in schools across the country. Mr. San Souci was the recipient of numerous awards throughout his career, and his adaptations are, according to Mary M. Burns in Horn Book, typified by "impeccable scholarship and a fluid storytelling style." 

His version of the Chinese legend of a young woman who takes her father’s place in war, posing as a man to fight the Tartars and winning glory in battle, was the basis for the Disney film Mulan, and he also wrote the story for the film. His output was primarily picture books, which were often retellings of folklore, but he has contributed original works to the horror and fantasy genres and has also put out non-fiction works aimed at children and adults. He was also a regular contributor to a variety of magazines for young readers including Cobblestone, Faces, Calliope, and Appleseeds.

Life and Career 
Author of both adult and children's books, Robert D. San Souci was highly regarded for his adaptations of folktales from around the world, including Europe, Asia, the British Isles, and the Americas. These include such popular titles as The Samurai's Daughter, The Enchanted Tapestry, The Talking Eggs, Sukey and the Mermaid, Cut from the Same Cloth, The Hired Hand, A Weave of Words, and the Caldecott Honor book The Faithful Friend. He also produced the spooky "Short and Shivery" and "Dare to Be Scared" series, an Arthurian sequence, and retellings of Native American myths, most of which are directed to middle graders. In addition to making more obscure or almost-forgotten stories accessible to young children, his work features female and male heroes from many different places and ethnicities, with a particular emphasis on strong female protagonists.

Mr. San Souci has stated that reading and writing have always been a part of his life -- his earliest memories are ones of being read to.

"I always knew I wanted to be a writer. Before I knew how to read and write, I would listen carefully to stories that were read to me, then I would retell them to my younger sister and brothers. But I would add a new twist or leave out parts I didn't find interesting -- so the storytelling impulse was already at work in me". When reflecting on his early writing process, he recalled, “Even before I learned to write, I would listen carefully to stories read to me. I would then retell these to my friends—but I left out things I didn't like and added things I thought would improve the story. Often, what I added were monsters, since these seemed to liven things up considerably.”

In elementary school, Mr. San Souci wrote for his school newspaper, and in high school, he enthusiastically worked on his school's yearbook. He was thrilled to have an essay of his printed in a book titled T.V. as Art. As a student at St. Mary’s College, he took a variety of classes in creative writing, English and world literature. In graduate school, he focused on the studies of folklore, myth and world religions.

As a budding writer, Mr. San Souci supported himself in the publishing field as a copywriter and a book editor. "All the time, I was writing newspaper articles, book and theater reviews, and stories for magazines", he notes. Prior to becoming a full-time author, Mr. San Souci held jobs as a bookseller, editor, advertising copywriter, newspaper, theatre and film reviewer.

Mr. San Souci said of his first published book: "In 1978, my first book, The Legend of Scarface, was published and illustrated by my younger brother, Daniel San Souci. The book was highly acclaimed. I was lucky to have an artist/illustrator in the family -- it’s great working with Dan".

Many of Mr. San Souci's ideas for books came from reading and researching. He also found inspiration by traveling and keeping his eyes open. "I love to travel by bus. I can sit and stare out the window and simply observe. I love to listen for the flow and rhythm of the language that different people use".

An avid traveler, he journeyed around the United States, drawing inspiration from local legends, folktales, and history for works such as Cut from the Same Cloth: American Women of Myth, Legend, and Tall Tale (1993), and Kate Shelley: Bound for Legend (1994).

Mr. San Souci said of his own work: “The majority of my books are retellings of folktales, myths, legends, and fairy tales from around the world. I think a large part of what urges me to write about global cultures (including our own) is a lifelong interest in the ways people live and think: the differences and similarities. Even as a child, I was intrigued with the idea of traveling (at least in my imagination) to the four corners of the world. This combined with my early (and enduring) love of fairy tales and folktales when I discovered Andrew Lang’s Rainbow Fairy Books, brimming with retold tales from the world’s folk literature. I was fascinated to discover how many stories from even the most exotic lands had echoes of the familiar tales by the Brothers Grimm or Hans Christian Andersen. It was exciting to find that, through these stories, I was able to understand and share a bond with peoples from many different regions. Today, in books such as A Weave of Words (Armenia), Cendrillon (the Caribbean), Little Gold Star (Mexico), or The Samurai’s Daughter (Japan), I try to share that sense of discovery and delight in how much alike and yet how wonderfully different are so many peoples.”

Mr. San Souci gave permission to storytellers to retell his stories with credit. He stated “There is value in keeping stories alive; they affirm cultures.”

Death 
Robert D. San Souci died December 19th, 2014, at the age of 68 following a head injury resulting from a fall.

San Souci is remembered by the library and children’s book community not only for his work but also for his commitment to his fans and willingness to help fellow authors. Children’s literature reviewer Sharon Levin fondly remembers his interactions with children. “He always made each child feel special, as he took time with them, chatted with them, and then wrote a full page letter to them in the book they were having signed,” says Levin. “Books signed by Robert San Souci are some of our most treasured books.” The author’s brother Daniel San Souci stressed his brother’s devotion to fans. “Robert loved traveling to schools and loved spending time with the kids,” he tells SLJ, highlighting one of his brother’s favorite stories from a school visit, describing a little girl who was “absolutely mesmerized by every word that he spoke.” When the presentation was over, the author asked for questions, calling on the attentive girl first, who replied, “’Mr. San Souci. You've got a piece of pepper or something else stuck to your front tooth.’” Dan added, “He really got a kick out of how honest kids were and some of the things they would say to him.” Author Jane Yolen, who wrote the introduction for Cut from the Same Cloth, emphasizes San Souci’s talents. “He was a storyteller's storyteller and understood how to be a minimalist yet find the greater meanings in the tales he told. He was never bombastic. He loved both people and stories. What could have been a greater life? And he outlives his death.” Cindy Kane Trumbore, too, who edited Sukey and the Mermaid (Macmillan, 1992) while editor-in-chief of Four Winds Press/Macmillan and Kate Shelley: Bound for Legend while executive editor of Dial Books, praised not only San Souci's talents but his larger-than-life personality. "He was an editor's dream," she says. "His research was impeccable, and while every word in his manuscripts had been carefully crafted, he loved to hear suggestions and responded to them enthusiastically. He was also a warm, thoughtful person and a great storyteller. I remember his description of a power failure early one morning in San Francisco that had caffeine-deprived residents pounding on the door of his local Starbucks and ordering them to open up. Thinking about that makes me miss his laugh!" “Everybody in the publishing business loved Robert,” said Daniel. “He went out of his way to help people out, whether it was editing a manuscript or helping them to find an agent or publisher.  He was truly happy for everyone and for their successes. So many people have contacted me and told me how he helped them out with their careers. I know he was responsible for many of the books I published. He was always the older brother looking out for me.”

In addition to Daniel, Robert D. San Souci is survived by another brother, Mike San Souci, of Bozeman, Montana, and a sister, Ellen Diamond, of Walnut Creek.

Select bibliography

Chapter books
Short & Shivery: Thirty Chilling Tales, illustrated by Katherine Coville (1987)
More Short & Shivery: Thirty Terrifying Tales, illustrated by Katherine Coville (1994)
Even More Short & Shivery: Thirty Spine-Tingling Tales, illustrated by Jacqueline Rogers (1997)
A Terrifying Taste of Short & Shivery: Thirty Creepy Tales, illustrated by Katherine Coville (1999)
Dare to Be Scared: Thirteen Stories to Chill and Thrill, illustrated by David Ouimet. Cricket Books (2003), 
Haunted Houses (Are You Scared Yet? 1), co-illustrated by Kelly Murphy and Antoine Revoy (2010)

Picture books
Sister Trickster, illustrated by Daniel San Souci
Young Merlin, illustrated by Daniel Horne
The Hobyahs
The Christmas Ark, illustrated by Daniel San Souci (1991)
Weave Of Words: An Armenian Tale Retold, illustrated by Raul Colon. Orchard Books (1998) (from a Nagorno-Karabakh folktale)
The Talking Eggs: A Folktale from the American South, illustrated by Jerry Pinkney. Dial Press (1989) (Caldecott Honor Book)
N.C. Wyeth's Pilgrims (1991) (illustrated by murals begun by Wyeth for the Metropolitan Life Insurance Company)
The Red Heels, illustrated by Gary Kelley. Dial Books (1996)
The Hired Hand: An African-American Folktale, illustrated by Jerry Pinkney. Dial Press (1997)
Two Bear Cubs: A Miwok Legend from California's Yosemite Valley, illustrated by Daniel San Souci. Yosemite Association (1997)
Cinderella Skeleton, illustrated by David Catrow (2004)
” The Twins and the Bird of Darkness: a Hero Tale from the Caribbean”, illustrated by Terry Widener (2002)
Cendrillon: A Caribbean Cinderella, illustrated by Brian Pinkney (2002)
Cut from the Same Rope: American Women of Myth, Legend, and Tall Tale, with Jane Yolen, illustrated by Brian Pinkney (2000)
Fa Mulan: The Story of a Woman Warrior, illustrated by Jean & Mou-Sein Tseng (1998) (based on the legend of Hua Mulan)
 The Faithful Friend, illustrated by Brian Pinkney
 Sootface: An Objibwa Cinderella Story, illustrated by Daniel San Souci (1994)

References

External links

San Souci at the Houghton Mifflin Publishing website
San Souci at the Scholastic Books website
San Souci at the Simon and Schuster Books website

2014 deaths
American children's writers
Writers from the San Francisco Bay Area
1946 births
Deaths from head injury
Accidental deaths from falls
Accidental deaths in California